John Macauley Letchworth Smith (April 10, 1905 – August 25, 1993) was an American long-distance runner. He competed in the men's 5000 metres at the 1928 Summer Olympics.

References

External links
 

1905 births
1993 deaths
Athletes (track and field) at the 1928 Summer Olympics
American male long-distance runners
Olympic track and field athletes of the United States
Sportspeople from Louisville, Kentucky
20th-century American people